Bates may refer to:

Places
 Bates, Arkansas, an unincorporated community
 Bates, Illinois. an unincorporated community in Sangamon County
 Bates, Michigan, a community in Grand Traverse County
 Bates, New York, a hamlet in the town of Ellington in Chautauqua County
 Bates, Oregon, unincorporated community in Grant County
 Bates County, Missouri, county in Missouri
 Bates Island, Biscoe Islands, Antarctica
 Bates Island (Massachusetts), Island in Lake Chaubunagungamaug
 Bates Point, in Victoria Land, Antarctica
 Bates Pond (Carver, Massachusetts), Twenty-acre pond
 Bates State Park, in Grant County, Oregon
 Bates Township, Michigan, in Iron County

People
 Bates (surname), a common surname
 Bates family, a banking family in the United States and the United Kingdom
 Bates Gill (born 1959), American political scientist
 Bates Lowry (1923–2004), American art historian

Organizations

Colleges and universities
 Bates College, a liberal arts college founded in 1855 in Lewiston, Maine
 Bates Technical College, a technical college founded in 1940 in Tacoma, Washington
 Bates Theological Seminary, also known as Cobb Divinity School

Companies and industries
 Bates 141, an advertising agency renamed Bates in 2011
 Bates Mill, a factory founded 1854 in Lewiston, Maine, producing textiles, also the site of an industrial park

Transportation and vehicles
 BATES, an acronym for BAllistic Test and Evaluation System
 Bates (automobile), an automobile manufactured by the Bates Automobile Company
 Bates Monoplane, a pioneering aircraft built by Carl Sterling Bates in 1911

Other 
 Bates method, a method of vision improvement
 Bates numbering, a number system for standardized document identification used in the legal, medical, and business fields
 The Bates, a German punk band
 Bates Uniform Footwear, a brand of footwear owned by Wolverine World Wide

See also
 Bates House (disambiguation)
 Bates Motel (disambiguation)
 Justice Bates (disambiguation)
 Bate (disambiguation)